The Passivhaus-Institut (PHI) is responsible for promoting and maintaining the Passivhaus building program.  The "Passivhaus Institute" was founded in 1996, and is based and active in Darmstadt, Germany.

The English spelling was used for the Passive House Institute US (PHIUS) when it formed in 2007   originally under the umbrella of the Passivhaus Institute. The two separated in 2012.

Though PHI and PHIUS sustainable design standards are different, they both share common goals for drastic energy conservation and carbon reduction through Sustainable architecture design techniques and specifications to create Low-energy houses and other structures with Low energy building practices for the public benefit worldwide.

See also

 List of low-energy building techniques
 History of passive solar building design
 Energy-efficient landscaping

References

Appropriate technology organizations
Architecture organizations
Engineering organizations
Non-profit organisations based in Hesse
Low-energy building
Sustainable architecture
Sustainable building in Germany
Sustainability organizations
Organizations established in 1996